John Linnett (1859 – 16 May 1902) was a member of the Queensland Legislative Assembly.

He was born at Essex, England, the son of William Linnett and his wife Rachel (née Cook). On arrival in Queensland, he trained as a butcher in Rockhampton from 1874 and remained in the industry all his life.

On 25 August 1887, he married Ellen Conner in Rockhampton. He died there in May 1902 and his funeral proceeded from his former residence to the North Rockhampton Cemetery.

Public life
Linnett, a Ministerialist, contested the 1901 by-election for the seat of Rockhampton North in June 1901 to replace James Stewart, who had moved to the Australian Senate. Henry Turner of the Labour Party was declared the victor by a single vote, but Linnett lodged a successful petition against the result and was declared the victor.

The 1902 state elections were held the following March and Linnett did not stand for re-election with Henry Turner winning the seat.

References

Members of the Queensland Legislative Assembly
1859 births
1902 deaths
19th-century Australian politicians